Lukáš Vácha (born 13 May 1989) is a Czech football midfielder, who currently plays for the reserve team of Czech side AC Sparta Prague B.

He has been on loan to  Jablonec and Baník Ostrava in previous seasons. He is member of the Czech under-21 team. He represented the team at the 2011 UEFA European Under-21 Football Championship. He made his national debut for Czech Republic on 21 May 2014 in a friendly match against Finland.

Club career
Vácha moved to AC Sparta Prague from Slovan Liberec in 2013. He won the Czech double with AC Sparta Prague by winning both the Czech First League and the Czech FA Cup in the 2013–2014 season.

In October 2016, his club ordered him to train with their women's team for stating "to the stove" in reaction to a decision against him by a female assistant referee, Lucie Ratajova.

Ahead of the 2019-20 season, Vácha was relegated to AC Sparta Prague B, the reserve team of AC Sparta Prague.

International career statistics

References

External links
 
 
 

1989 births
Living people
Czech footballers
Czech Republic youth international footballers
Czech Republic under-21 international footballers
Czech Republic international footballers
Czech First League players
SK Slavia Prague players
FC Slovan Liberec players
FC Baník Ostrava players
FK Jablonec players
AC Sparta Prague players
Association football midfielders
Footballers from Prague